Euforia (born December 5, 1974) is the ring name of a second-generation Mexican luchador Enmascarado, (or masked professional wrestler), currently working for Consejo Mundial de Lucha Libre (CMLL). Euforia's real name is not a matter of public record, as is often the case with masked wrestlers in Mexico where their private lives are kept a secret from the wrestling fans. Euforia has a son,  Soberano Jr., who also wrestles in CMLL.

Euforia is currently in his second stint with the Los Nuevos Infernales stable, under the leadership of El Satánico. He was formerly a part of Los Cancerberos del Infierno under the leadership of Virus, while also forming a tag team with Nosferatu. He was also formerly a part of Los Guerreros del Infierno/Los Guerreros Laguneros under the leadership of Último Guerrero.

Personal life
As Euforia has never been unmasked in the ring via a Lucha de Apuestas ("Bet match") his real name is not a matter of public knowledge, a lucha libre tradition where the names of enmascarados (masked wrestlers) are not reported on. He was born on December 5, 1974 in Torreón, Coahuila, Mexico, son of Pablo Moreno Román. Moreno was a professional wrestler known under the ring name "El Soberano" ("the Sovereign"). Euforia's older brother, Pablo Moreno Leon, wrestled under the ring name Stranger until his death in 2000. A younger brother works under the ring name "El Hijo del Soberano" ("The son of El Soberano"). Euforia's son, born August 12, 1993, followed in his father's and grandfather's footsteps and became a professional wrestler in 2007. He was originally known as "El Niete del Soberano" ("The Grandson of El Soberano") but is better known under the ring name El Soberano Jr. / El Soberano, both of which are used interchangeably.

Professional wrestling career
The wrestler currently known as Euforia made his professional wrestling debut on May 28, 1990 under the name "Soberano Jr." ("Sovereign Jr."). He wrestled for many years alongside both his father and his brother on the Mexican independent circuit, especially around his home region in Torreón, Coahuila. Soberano made his Consejo Mundial de Lucha Libre (CMLL) debut on April 23, 2006, in the second match of the show. He only wrestled a limited number of matches before disappearing from CMLL shows.

Los Nuevos Infernales (2007–2009)

In 2007 Soberano Jr. returned to the CMLL rings, but had been repackaged as "Euforia", a darker Rudo character (a "heel", those that portray the villains in wrestling) that was teamed up with El Satánico and Nosferatu to form Los Nuevos Infernales ("The New Infernals"), the latest incarnation of the Los Infernales group. In June 2007, Euforia was one of eight Novatos (rookies) that participated in the 2007 Gran Alternativa tournament, where an experienced wrestler teams up with a newcomer. Euforia teamed up with top Rudo Último Guerrero for the tournament, defeating Súper Comando and Villano V in the first round and Dos Caras Jr. and Valiente in the second round to earn a spot in the finals. The 2007 Gran Alternativa finals saw Místico and La Sombra defeat Último Guerrero and Euforia. In June 2008, Los Nuevos Infernales entered a tournament for the vacant CMLL Arena Coliseo Tag Team Championship. In the first round Euforia and Nosferatu defeated Los Rayos Tapatio, in the second round they beat Metallik and Metálico and in the third round they eliminated Ángel Azteca Jr. and Máscara Purpura to earn a spot in the finals. The final match saw Flash and Stuka Jr. defeat Los Nuevos Infernales to win the Arena Coliseo Tag Team Championship. Following their loss Los Nuevo Infernales began a long running rivalry with Flash and Stuka Jr., a rivalry that saw Euforia and Nosferatu unsuccessfully challenge for the Arena Coliseo Tag Team titles on December 14, 2008. Euforia and Nosferatu defeated the champions in a non-title match at CMLL's La Hora Cero pay-per-view on January 11, 2009. By mid-2009 Euforia and Nosferatu teamed less and less. Nosferatu was replaced by Skandalo in a trios match that saw Eurforia, Virus and Skandalo defeat Flash, Stuka Jr. and Metalico on the undercard of the 2009 Infierno en el Ring event.

Los Cancerberos del Infierno (2009–2012)

On November 18, 2009 CMLL presented a new Rudo group that they had formed, Los Cancerberos del Infierno ("The Infernal Cerberi") a team led by veteran mid-ranked worker Virus and consisted of Euforia and Pólvora as well as two new characters never used before - Raziel and Cancerbero. It was later revealed that Raziel and Cancerbero were not two new wrestlers CMLL brought in but actually two low card wrestlers that had been repackaged, Raziel was previously known as Caligula while Cancerbero was called Messala. In late 2009 Pólvora teamed up with Euforia and Virus to represent Los Cancerberos in a tournament to crown the new Mexican National Trios Champion. The team defeated Los Ángeles Celestiales (Ángel Azteca Jr., Ángel de Plata and Ángel de Oro) in the first round, but lost to eventual tournament winners Mascara Dorada, Stuka Jr. and Metro in the second round. Following the tournament loss Los Ángeles Celestiales and Los Cancerberos del Infierno have developed a rivalry between the two groups, facing off on various CMLL shows, including their Friday night CMLL Super Viernes show. In early 2010 Euforia was entered in the inaugural Parejas Incredibles Nacional tournament, a tournament where CMLL  groups a tecnico and a Rudo together for a contest where teams represent the region they trained in. Euforia teamed up with Ephesto to form the only "all rudo" team in the group. In the first round Euforia and Ephesto lost to tournament favorites Místico and Averno. In April 2012, Euforia and CMLL World Heavyweight Champion El Terrible won the 2012 Gran Alternativa. The same month he entered the En Busca de un Ídolo tournament/reality television show, where he made it to the finals before losing to Titán.

Los Guerreros Laguneros (2012–2021)

On July 6, 2012, Euforia was named the newest member of Último Guerrero's Los Guerreros del Infierno stable. In January 2013, Euforia made his Japanese debut, when he took part in the three-day Fantastica Mania 2013 event, co-promoted by CMLL and New Japan Pro-Wrestling in Tokyo. During the first night on January 18, he teamed with Okumura in a tag team match, where they were defeated by Tama Tonga and Titán. The following night, Euforia was defeated in a singles match by Atlantis. During the third and final night, Euforia teamed with Kazuchika Okada and Mephisto in a six-man tag team main event, where they were defeated by Atlantis, Hiroshi Tanahashi and Prince Devitt. Euforia was teamed up with tecnico Diamante Azul for the 2013 Torneo Nacional de Parejas Increibles ("National Incredible Pairs Tournament") where the concept was that rivals would team up for a tag team tournament. The team defeated Ángel de Oro and Ephesto in the tournament's first round, but lost to Atlantis and Último Guerrero in the second round. A year later, Euforia won the 2014 Torneo Nacional de Parejas Increibles tournament teaming with Atlantis. On March 28, 2014, Euforia won his first title, when he, Niebla Roja and Último Guerrero defeated Los Estetas del Aire (Máscara Dorada, Místico and Valiente) for the CMLL World Trios Championship. They lost the title to Sky Team (Místico, Valiente and Volador Jr.) on February 13, 2015. Euforia was a participant in the 2017 International Gran Prix. He was eliminated from the torneo cibernetico by Kenny King on September 1.

On July 1, 2018, Los Guerreros Laguneros ended Sky Team's 1,223-day reign with the CMLL World Trios Championship as they defeated them in the main event of CMLL's Domingos Arena México show. Subsequently, Los Guerreros were positioned as "Defenders of CMLL" as they began a storyline feud with The Cl4n (Ciber the Main Man, The Chrizh and Sharlie Rockstar), three wrestlers who had made a name for themselves in CMLL's main rival Lucha Libre AAA Worldwide. On September 14, The Cl4n won the World Trios Championship, but Los Guerreros won the championship back two weeks later on September 28. On March 26, 2021, they lost the World Trios Championship to Nueva Generación Dinamita, resulting in Euforia turning on Último Guerrero and leaving the stable.

Second stint with Los Nuevos Infernales (2021–present)
On September 24, 2020, at Aniversario 88, Euforia rejoined the reformed Los Infernales, alongside El Satánico, Mephisto and Hechicero, after the latter defeated Último Guerrero for the CMLL World Heavyweight Championship.

Championships and accomplishments

Consejo Mundial de Lucha Libre
CMLL World Tag Team Championship (1 time)  – with Gran Guerrero
CMLL World Trios Championship (3 times) – with Niebla Roja and Último Guerrero (1) and Gran Guerrero and Último Guerrero (2)
CMLL Torneo Gran Alternativa (2012) – with El Terrible
CMLL Torneo Nacional de Parejas Increibles (2014) – with Atlantis
Copa Dinastías (2022) - with Soberano Jr.
 Pro Wrestling Illustrated
 Ranked No. 161 of the top 500 singles wrestlers in the PWI 500 in 2021

References

1974 births
Mexican male professional wrestlers
Living people
Masked wrestlers
Professional wrestlers from Coahuila
People from Torreón
Unidentified wrestlers
20th-century professional wrestlers
21st-century professional wrestlers
CMLL World Tag Team Champions
CMLL World Trios Champions